Fat Freddy's Drop have released seven studio albums, two live albums, and several singles. Their songs have appeared on compilation albums both in New Zealand and internationally. In 2007, they released a DVD, Fantastic Voyages Vol. 1, with live footage from their 2006 World Cup Tour, music videos, and behind the scenes footage.

Studio albums

Live albums

Extended plays

Singles

Other charted songs

DVDs

Music videos

Featured appearances
 (1999) - 21st Celebration (NZ) (Radio Active) - Hope
 (2000) - One Love (NZ) (Radio Active) - Wairunga Blues
 (2001) - Loop 002 (NZ) (Loop Recordings) - Little One (Live At McDonalds)
 (2001) - Styles Upon Styles Part 1 (NZ) (Sugarlicks) - Runnin' (Studio Version)
 (2002) - Loop 003 (NZ) (Loop Recordings) - Runnin
 (2002) - Loop 004 (NZ) (Loop Recordings) - Bluey
 (2002) - The Green Room 001 (NZ) (Loop Recordings) - Runnin
 (2003) - Weekend Sessions (NZ/AUS) (Liberation Music) - Seconds
 (2003) - Whopper Chopper Seaside Extravaganza (NZ) (Whopper Chopper Trust) - Willow Tree (Live in Berlin at Cafe Moskau)
 (2004) - The Eclectic Sessions Vol. 2 (UK) (Trust The DJ Records) - Hope
 (2004) - Best Seven Selections (Best Seven/Sonar Kollektive) - Hope & This Room
 (2004) - Conscious Roots (NZ) (Capitol Music/Moving Production) - Hope
 (2005) - Conscious Roots 2 (NZ) (Capitol Music) - Ernie
 (2005) - Dub Conspiracy (NZ) (record label unknown) - Mightnight Marauders (Live on Gilles Peterson)
 (2005) - The Green Room 004 (NZ) (Loop Recordings) - Hope
 (2007) - Nu Reggae (FR) (Wagram Music) - Wandering Eye
 (2010) - Nova Tunes 2.1 (FR)  - The Raft

Notes

References

 

Discographies of New Zealand artists
Reggae discographies
Rhythm and blues discographies
Folk music discographies